Alan Mulholland (born 1968) is an Irish Gaelic football former manager and player. He was manager of the senior Galway county team from 2011 until 2014, having previously been manager of the minor and under-21 teams.

In 2007, Mulholland guided Galway to the All-Ireland Minor Football Championship, defeating Derry, as well as guiding them to the U21 Final in which they defeated Cavan in May 2011. On 3 October 2011, Mulholland was appointed as manager of the Galway senior football team, replacing Tomás Ó Flatharta.

References

1968 births
Living people
Bookmakers
Gaelic football managers
Galway inter-county Gaelic footballers
Irish businesspeople
Irish international rules football players
Salthill-Knocknacarra Gaelic footballers
Sportspeople from Galway (city)